Bertrange is a commune and town in south-western Luxembourg. It is located 6.5 km west of Luxembourg City.

, the town of Bertrange, which lies in the north-east of the commune, has a population of 6,021, of which just over half are Luxembourgers. People of over 60 different nationalities live in the commune.

To the north of the town of Bertrange, on the other side of the route d'Arlon, is the village of Tossenberg, next to which is Luxembourg's largest shopping centre, La Belle Etoile.

History
The Treveri, a Gallic tribe, inhabited the region for several hundred years until they were conquered by Julius Caesar in 54 BC.  During the Gallo-Roman era which lasted until about 450, the Romans built a number of roads in the area including the Kiem (Latin caminus, road) linking Trier to Reims. It passed through Strassen (Strata) to what is now Bertrange at Tossenberg where there was a refreshment post for travellers and continued to nearby Mamer (Mambra), a Roman vicus, and Arlon (Orolauneum). Another road connected Tossenberg to Titelberg near Rodange. Evidence of Gallo-Roman and indeed Treveri inhabitants in Bertrange was found during excavations starting 1997.

There was probably a feudal castle in Bertrange as its lords are mentioned in documents establishing the freedom of Echternach in 1226 and of Luxembourg in 1243.

Population

Politics
Like nearby Luxembourg City, Bertrange is one of the strongest communes for the Democratic Party (DP), with 47% of the vote cast in the 2005 communal elections being for the DP.  In the communal council, the DP rules outright, with six of the eleven councillors.  The mayor is consequently the DP candidate, Frank Colabianchi, who heads an administration also consisting of two échevins.

Twin Town — Sister City

Bertrange is twinned with:
 Santa Maria Nuova, Italy

See also
Helfenterbruck, a forest and upscale semi-rural neighborhood in Bertrange
Schauwenburg Castle

References

External links

 Commune of Bertrange official website

 
Communes in Luxembourg (canton)
Towns in Luxembourg